Damian Baliński (born 5 August 1977, in Poland) is a motorcycle speedway rider from Poland.

Career
He was a member of the Poland national speedway team. Remarkably, in 29 seasons of Polish speedway he has only ridden for three clubs Unia Leszno, Rybnik and Rawicz.

He only rode one season in the British leagues, with Swindon Robins in 2007.

Family
His older brother Dariusz and his son Damian Jr. (Damian's nephew; b. 1989) are also speedway riders. Baliński is married to Aneta. They have two sons, Mikołaj and Filip (b. 2009).

Speedway Grand Prix results

Career details

World Championship 
 Individual World Championship (Speedway Grand Prix)
 2008 - notclassify (0 heats at European SGP)
 Individual Under-21 World Championship
 1996 -  Olching - track reserve
 1998 -  Piła - 8th place (7 points)
 Team World Championship (Speedway World Cup)
 2007  Leszno - World Champion

European Championships 
 Individual European Championship
 2005 -  Lonigo - 5th place (10 points)
 2006 -  Miskolc - 7th place (8 points)
 European Pairs Championship
 2006 - started in Semi-Final 2 only (6 points)

Polish Championships 
 Individual Polish Championship
 2007 - Bronze medal
 2008 -  Leszno - 5th place (9 points)
 Individual Under-21 Polish Championship
 1996 - Bronze medal
 Polish Pairs Championship
 1999 - Silver medal
 2003 - Polish Champion
 2007 - Bronze medal
 Polish Pairs Under-21 Championship
 1996 - Polish Champion
 1997 - Polish Champion
 Team Polish Championship
 2002 - Silver medal
 2007 - Polish Champion
 Team Under-21 Team Championship
 1996 - Bronze medal
 1997 - Bronze medal

Others competitions 
 Golden Helmet
 2005 - Runner-up
 2008 -  Wrocław - Winner
 Under-19 Bronze Helmet
 1996 - Gold medal
 Team Speedway Polish Cup
 1997 - Silver medal
 1998 - Silver medal
 Mieczysław Połukard Criterium of Polish Speedway Leagues Aces
 2008 -  Bydgoszcz - 7th place (8 points)

See also 
 Poland national speedway team
 Speedway in Poland
 List of Speedway Grand Prix riders

References 

1977 births
Living people
Polish speedway riders
Speedway World Cup champions
Swindon Robins riders
People from Leszno
Sportspeople from Greater Poland Voivodeship